David Karfunkle (1880–1959) was an American artist. He is known for his mural, "Exploitation of Labor and Hoarding of Wealth", painted in 1936 at the Harlem Courthouse.

Biography
He was born in Vienna.
He studied with Ludwig von Herterich, and Antoine Bourdelle.
He studied at the National Academy of Design, with William Glackens.
In 1911, he showed at the Salmagundi Club.
In 1916, he had a group exhibition at the Strauss Gallery.

He was a member of the Federal Art Project.

References

External links
David Karfunkel paintings at Artfact

1880 births
1959 deaths
20th-century American painters
American male painters
American muralists
Artists from Vienna
Painters from New York City
Federal Art Project artists
20th-century American male artists
Austro-Hungarian emigrants to the United States